The Asahi-Ryokuken Yomiuri Memorial was a professional golf tournament that was held at the Asoiizuka Golf Club near Keisen in Fukuoka Prefecture, Japan from 2004 to 2006. It was on the Japan Golf Tour. The purse for the final event in 2006 was ¥100,000,000, with ¥20,000,000 going to the winner.

Winners

External links
Coverage on Japan Golf Tour's official site

Former Japan Golf Tour events
Defunct golf tournaments in Japan
Sport in Fukuoka Prefecture
Recurring sporting events established in 2004
Recurring sporting events disestablished in 2006